Tris(8-hydroxyquinolinato)aluminium is the chemical compound with the formula Al(C9H6NO)3.  Widely abbreviated Alq3, it is a coordination complex wherein aluminium is bonded in a bidentate manner to the conjugate base of three 8-hydroxyquinoline ligands.

Structure
Both the meridional and facial isomers are known as well as several polymorphs (different crystalline forms).

Synthesis
The compound is prepared by the reaction of 8-hydroxyquinoline with aluminium(III) sources
Al3+ + 3 C9H7NO  →  Al(C9H6NO)3  +  3 H+

Applications
Alq3 is a common component of organic light-emitting diodes (OLEDs).  Variations in the substituents on the quinoline rings affect its luminescence properties.

References

Quinolinols
Coordination complexes
Aluminium compounds